Osterley is a small rural suburb of the Port Stephens local government area in the Hunter Region of New South Wales, Australia. Most of the small population lives in the elevated part of the suburb along Hinton Road, east of Barties Creek which is a tributary of the Hunter River. The area to the west of Barties creek is low-lying and subject to periodic flooding. .In 2016 117 people live there with a median age of 46.

Osterley Creamery 
Osterley was the first creamery in the lower Hunter in April 1892. It was officially known as Hunter River Pioneer Co-operative Creamery but many referred to it as Osterley Creamery. It closed down in November 1903.

Notes

References

Suburbs of Port Stephens Council